Semisulcospira gredleri is a species of freshwater snail with an operculum, an aquatic gastropod mollusk in the family Semisulcospiridae.

The specific name gredleri is in honor of Vinzenz Maria Gredler.

Distribution 
This species occurs in Jiangsu Province, China.

Description
The female reproductive system was described by Prozorova & Rasshepkina in 2005.

References

External links

Semisulcospiridae